Codex Montfortianus designated by 61 (on the list Gregory-Aland; Soden's δ 603), and known as Minuscule 61 is a Greek minuscule manuscript of the New Testament on paper. Erasmus named it Codex Britannicus. Its completion is dated on the basis of its textual affinities to no earlier than the second decade of the 16th century, though a 15th-century date is possible on palaeographic grounds.
The manuscript is famous for including a unique version of the Comma Johanneum. It has marginalia.

Description 

The codex contains the entire of the New Testament. The text is written in one column per page, 21 lines per page, on 455 paper leaves.

There is also another division according to the smaller Ammonian Sections, with references to the Eusebian Canons.

The titles of the sacred books were written in red ink.

The order of books: Gospels, Pauline epistles, Acts, General epistles (James, Jude, 1-2 Peter, 1-3 John), and Book of Revelation. The order of General epistles is the same as in Minuscule 326.

Text 

The Greek text of the Gospels and Acts of this codex is a representative of the Byzantine text-type, Aland placed it in Category V. In the Pauline epistles and General epistles its text is mixed, and Aland placed it in Category III. 
In the Book of Revelation its text belongs to the Byzantine text-type but with a large number of unique textual variants, in a close relationship to Uncial 046, and Minuscule 69. In the Gospels it is close to the manuscripts 56, 58, and in the Acts and Epistles to 326. Marginal readings in the first hand of Revelation are clearly derived from the 1516 edition of Erasmus.
It was not examined by the Claremont Profile Method.

In 1 John 5:6 it has textual variant δι' ὕδατος καὶ αἵματος καὶ πνεύματος ἁγίου (through water and blood and the Holy Spirit) together with the manuscripts: 39, 326, 1837. Bart D. Ehrman identified this reading as an Orthodox corrupt reading.

It contains a late-Vulgate-based version of the Comma Johanneum as an integral part of the text. An engraved facsimile of the relevant page can be seen in Thomas Hartwell Horne, An Introduction to the Critical Study and Knowledge of the Holy Scriptures (London: Cadell and Davies, 1818), vol. 2.2, p. 118.

History 

It was the first Greek manuscript discovered to contain any version of the Comma Johanneum in 1 John chapter 5. It was copied from an earlier manuscript that did not have the Comma. The Comma was translated from the Latin. Its earliest known owner was Froy, a Franciscan friar, then Thomas Clement (1569), then William Chark (1582), then Thomas Montfort (from whom it derives its present name), then Archbishop Ussher, who caused the collation to be made which appears in Walton's Polyglott (Matthew 1:1; Acts 22:29; Romans 1), and presented the manuscript to Trinity College.

Erasmus cited this manuscript Codex Britannicus as his source for his  (slightly modified) Comma in his third edition of Novum Testamentum (1522). Erasmus misprinted εμαις for εν αις in Apocalypse 2:13.

It was described by Wettstein
and Orlando Dobbin. C. R. Gregory saw it in 1883.

The codex now is located at Trinity College (Ms. 30) in Dublin.

See also 

 List of New Testament minuscules
 Textus Receptus
 Textual criticism

Notes

References

Further reading 
 
 
 Grantley McDonald, Biblical Criticism in Early Modern Europe: Erasmus, the Johannine Comma, and Trinitarian Debate (Cambridge: Cambridge University Press, 2016)

External links 

 R. Waltz, Codex Montfortianus at the Encyclopedia of Textual Criticism (2007)
 Digital images of the manuscript online at Trinity College Dublin.

Greek New Testament minuscules
16th-century biblical manuscripts